Erró (born Guðmundur Guðmundsson in 1932 in Ólafsvík, Iceland) is a visual artist and painter, who is best known for his painted pop art collages of images from comic books and advertisements. He lives in France and Spain.

Career
Erró studied art in Norway and in Italy, and has resided in Paris, Thailand, and on the island of Formentera for most of his life. In 1989 he donated a large collection of his works to the Reykjavik Arts Museum, which has put part of it on permanent display and opened a website where the whole collection can be visited.

A major retrospective of his work was held at the Museum of Contemporary Art in Lyon (France) in 2015.

In 2010 he was accused of plagiarism by Brian Bolland for copying his work uncredited and selling it.

References

External links 
  Erró
 
Portrait of Erró by Braun-Vega

1932 births
Living people
Icelandic painters
Postmodern artists
Pop artists
People involved in plagiarism controversies
20th-century Icelandic people
Recipients of the Prince Eugen Medal
Icelandic contemporary artists